Karl Schulz (born 10 May 1901, date of death unknown) was a German international footballer.

References

1901 births
Year of death missing
Association football midfielders
German footballers
Germany international footballers